A cam-in-block engine is where the camshaft is located in the engine block. Types of cam-in-block engines are:

 F-Head Engine
 Flathead engine
 Overhead valve engine (the only type where the valves are above the combustion chamber)
 T-head engine